The Ira W. Gardner House is a historic house in Salem, Utah, United States was built in 1895.  It was listed on the National Register of Historic Places (NRHP) in 1977.

According to its NRHP nomination "the Gardner Home is considered the town's landmark residence." The NRHP lists the address as 10 North Main Street, but the actual address of the property is 15 East Center Street.

See also

 National Register of Historic Places listings in Utah County, Utah

References

External links

Houses completed in 1895
Houses on the National Register of Historic Places in Utah
Queen Anne architecture in Utah
Houses in Utah County, Utah
National Register of Historic Places in Utah County, Utah
Salem, Utah